The men's 10,000 metres event was part of the track and field athletics programme at the 1928 Summer Olympics. The competition was held on Sunday, July 29, 1928. Twenty-four long-distance runners from twelve nations competed.

Records
These were the standing world and Olympic records (in minutes) prior to the 1928 Summer Olympics.

Paavo Nurmi set a new Olympic record with 30:18.8 minutes.

Results

Only a final race was held.

References

External links
 Official Olympic Report
 

10000 metres
10,000 metres at the Olympics
Men's events at the 1928 Summer Olympics